Robert A. "Bob" Johnson (December 1, 1945 – June 20, 2017) was an American politician, farmer, and school social worker.

Johnson was born in Minneapolis, Minnesota. He received his bachelor's degree in psychology and social work from Bemidji State University, Bemidji, Minnesota. He lived in Bemidji, Minnesota and was a school social worker. Johnson was also a game bird farmer. Johnson served in the Minnesota House of Representatives from 1987 to 1997 and was a Democrat. Johnson died in Woodbury, Minnesota.

Notes

1945 births
2017 deaths
Politicians from Minneapolis
People from Bemidji, Minnesota
Bemidji State University alumni
American social workers
Farmers from Minnesota
Democratic Party members of the Minnesota House of Representatives